Luciano Caravani (born 14 May 1953) is a retired Italian sprinter who specialized in the 100 and 200 metres. He was born in Vicenza, Veneto. He won six medals  at the International athletics competitions, of these five with the national relay team.

Biography
His personal best 100 metres time is 10.23 seconds, achieved in August 1984 in Zurich. His personal best 200 metres time is 20.59 seconds, achieved in July 1979 in Algiers. He has 34 caps in national team from 1975 to 1983.

Achievements

National titles
In the "Pietro Mennea era", Luciano Caravani has won two times the individual national championship.
1 win in the 100 metres (1977)
1 win in the 60 metres indoor (1975)

See also
 Italy national relay team

References

External links
 

1953 births
Living people
Italian male sprinters
Athletes (track and field) at the 1976 Summer Olympics
Olympic athletes of Italy
Sportspeople from Vicenza
Athletics competitors of Fiamme Oro
Mediterranean Games gold medalists for Italy
Mediterranean Games silver medalists for Italy
Athletes (track and field) at the 1975 Mediterranean Games
Athletes (track and field) at the 1979 Mediterranean Games
Universiade medalists in athletics (track and field)
Mediterranean Games medalists in athletics
Universiade gold medalists for Italy
Universiade silver medalists for Italy
Italian Athletics Championships winners
Medalists at the 1977 Summer Universiade
Medalists at the 1979 Summer Universiade
20th-century Italian people
21st-century Italian people